Making Monsters may mean:

Making Monsters (TV series), a 2010s American TV series
Making Monsters (album), a 2010 album by Combichrist
Making Monsters: False Memories, Psychotherapy, and Sexual Hysteria, a 1994 book by Richard Ofshe and Ethan Watters
"Making Monsters" (song), a song by Five Finger Death Punch on their 2020 album F8

See also
The Making of Monsters, a 1991 Canadian short film